KKCQ may refer to:

 KKCQ (AM), a radio station (1480 AM) licensed to Fosston, Minnesota, United States
 KKCQ-FM, a radio station (96.7 FM) licensed to Bagley, Minnesota, United States